Sahib Bir Singh (born 27 January 1990) is all India Silver Medalist-Boxing and Gold Medalist Punjab Boxing. He was born in Jatt family on 27 January 1990 in village Parour, Patiala district, Punjab.

References

Indian male boxers
1990 births
People from Patiala district
Martial artists from Punjab, India
Living people
Super-middleweight boxers
21st-century Indian people